Another Day is the debut EP by English hardcore emo/metalcore group The Hurt Process, released on the Loudspeaker label in 2002 (see 2003 in music).

Track listing
"Intro" – 1:26
"Two Months From A Year" – 3:59
"Another Day" – 3:34
"Powder Burn" – 3:39
"Encouraging Reflection" – 3:26
"Subsistence" – 4:12
"Black Umbrella" – 4:23

References

The Hurt Process albums
2002 debut EPs